Umpty may refer to:
 Umpty, an indefinitely large number
A possible source of the Australian place name Humpty Doo